74 may refer to:

 74 (number)
 one of the years 74 BC, AD 74, 1974, 2074
 The 74, an American nonprofit news website
 Seventy-four (ship), a type of two-decked sailing ship

See also
 List of highways numbered